Auf Achse ("on the road",  "on the axle") is a logistics-themed board game designed by Wolfgang Kramer and published in 1987 by FX Schmid.  The game won the Spiel des Jahres award.  In 1992, a junior edition was released; and in 1994 a rummy-like card game spinoff was released. In 2007 a revised edition was published by Schmidt Spiele.

In a 1990 interview, Kramer revealed that "Although it has sold very well, Auf Achse is not really one of my favourites."

References

External links

 
English rules translation
Tips for Good Play

Board games introduced in 1987
German games
Racing board games
Spiel des Jahres winners
Wolfgang Kramer games